Inglisella marwicki (formerly called Waipaoa marwicki) is a species of sea snail in the family Cancellariidae, the nutmeg snails. It is found in the Exclusive economic zone of New Zealand.

References

 at nzor.org.nz
 at mollusca.co.nz
 at molluscabsae.org
Maxwell, P.A. (2009). Cenozoic Mollusca. pp. 232–254 in Gordon, D.P. (ed.) New Zealand inventory of biodiversity. Volume one. Kingdom Animalia: Radiata, Lophotrochozoa, Deuterostomia. Canterbury University Press, Christchurch.
Spencer, H.G., Marshall, B.A. & Willan, R.C. (2009). Checklist of New Zealand living Mollusca. pp. 196–219. in: Gordon, D.P. (ed.) New Zealand inventory of biodiversity. Volume one. Kingdom Animalia: Radiata, Lophotrochozoa, Deuterostomia. Canterbury University Press, Christchurch.

Cancellariidae
Gastropods described in 1956